Azadabad may refer to:
 Azadabad, Ardabil
 Azadabad, Meshgin Shahr, Ardabil Province
 Azadabad, Lorestan
 Azadabad, Zanjan